Fujimi, Saitama held a mayoral election on July 13, 2008. Independent candidate Shingo Hoshino won the election, beating incumbent mayor Kiyoshi Urano supported by the Liberal Democratic Party and Masaru Kaneko, supported by the Japanese Communist Party. Polling turnout increased almost 5%, up from record-low 36% in 2004 to just above 41%.

Results

References 
 Results from JanJan 
 JanJan coverage 

Fujimi, Saitama
2008 elections in Japan
Mayoral elections in Japan
July 2008 events in Japan